The castra of Federi was a fort in the Roman province of Dacia. The dates of its erection and of its abandonment by the Romans have not been determined. The ruins of the castra are located in Federi (commune Pui, Romania).

See also
List of castra

External links
Roman castra from Romania - Google Maps / Earth

Notes

Roman legionary fortresses in Romania
Roman legionary fortresses in Dacia
Ancient history of Transylvania